Jordan Lake can refer to:

 Jordan Lake (Alabama)
 Jordan Lake, North Carolina
 Jordan Lake (Nova Scotia), in the Shelburne District
 Jordan Lake (Guysborough), in Nova Scotia
 Jordan Lake (Utah), in the Uinta Mountains